Sleepy Eye is a small city in rural Brown County, Minnesota, United States. The city is named after a famed local Dakota chief from the 1800s. The population was 3,599 at the 2010 census.

History 
Sleepy Eye took its name from Sleepy Eye Lake, which was named after Chief Sleepy Eye, who was known as a compassionate person with droopy eyelids (or maybe just one). The chief was one of four Sioux Native Americans (four Ojibwe also attended) chosen to meet President James Monroe in 1824 in the nation's capital. Later, Sleepy Eye was an integral player in the 1851 signing of the Treaty of Traverse des Sioux, which gave all the land but a 10-mile swath on each side of the upper Minnesota River to the U.S. government. His recommendations to traders led to the successful settlement of Mankato, away from flood areas, and the chief eventually settled his people near the lake now known as Sleepy Eye Lake.

Sleepy Eye was platted in 1872 and incorporated as a city in 1903.

Geography

Demographics

2010 census
As of the census of 2010, there were 3,599 people, 1,475 households, and 931 families living in the city. The racial makeup of the city was 94.3% White, 0.1% Native American, 0.9% Asian, 4.1% from other races, and 0.7% from two or more races. Hispanic or Latino of any race were 13.0% of the population.

There were 1,475 households, of which 30.1% had children under the age of 18 living with them, 51.4% were married couples living together, 8.3% had a female householder with no husband present, 3.4% had a male householder with no wife present, and 36.9% were non-families. 33.4% of all households were made up of individuals, and 17.8% had someone living alone who was 65 years of age or older. The average household size was 2.36 and the average family size was 3.04.

The median age in the city was 42.2 years. 25.6% of residents were under the age of 18; 6.5% were between the ages of 18 and 24; 21.1% were from 25 to 44; 27.3% were from 45 to 64; and 19.4% were 65 years of age or older. The gender makeup of the city was 47.4% male and 52.6% female.

2000 census
As of the census of 2000, there were 3,515 people, 1,479 households, and 942 families living in the city. The racial makeup of the city was 94.03% White, 0.23% African American, 0.06% Native American, 0.34% Asian, 3.90% from other races, and 1.45% from two or more races. Hispanic or Latino of any race were 7.80% of the population.

There were 1,479 households, out of which 31.8% had children under the age of 18 living with them, 53.3% were married couples living together, 7.3% had a female householder with no husband present, and 36.3% were non-families. 34.5% of all households were made up of individuals, and 19.8% had someone living alone who was 65 years of age or older.  The average household size was 2.37 and the average family size was 3.08.

In the city, the population was spread out, with 28.0% under the age of 18, 6.8% from 18 to 24, 26.0% from 25 to 44, 19.9% from 45 to 64, and 19.3% who were 65 years of age or older.  The median age was 38 years. For every 100 females, there were 92.5 males.  For every 100 females age 18 and over, there were 87.3 males.

The median income for a household in the city was $37,123, and the median income for a family was $48,500. Males had a median income of $31,612 versus $22,907 for females. The per capita income for the city was $20,175.  About 4.7% of families and 8.1% of the population were below the poverty line, including 10.7% of those under age 18 and 10.2% of those age 65 or over.

Pop culture
Residents of Sleepy Eye made national headlines in the early 1990s for trying to ban MTV in the town.

On the television series Little House on the Prairie, Charles Ingalls sometimes made deliveries to Sleepy Eye, which was portrayed as the nearest larger town to Walnut Grove, Minnesota, where the Ingallses resided. It was also the (fictional) home of the blind school that Mary Ingalls and her TV-husband, Adam Kendall, ran later in the series.

Transportation
U.S. Route 14 and Minnesota State Highways 4, and 68 are three of the main arterial routes in the city.

Notable people

 Helen Fischer, signer of the Alaska Constitution, was born in Sleepy Eye.
 Scott Jensen, Minnesota state senator, physician, and candidate in the 2022 Minnesota gubernatorial election, was born and raised in Sleepy Eye.
 Dana Kiecker, former Major League Baseball pitcher, was born in Sleepy Eye.
 Bernard F. Mathiowetz, Wisconsin legislator and lawyer, was born in Sleepy Eye.
 John Louis Nuelsen, former Methodist pastor, college and seminary professor, theologian, author, editor.
 Ingerval M. Olsen, Minnesota Supreme Court justice, practiced law in Sleepy Eye.
 Harvey N. Paulson, farmer and Minnesota state legislator, lived in Sleepy Eye.

Gallery

See also

 National Register of Historic Places listings in Brown County, Minnesota
 St. Mary's High School (Sleepy Eye, Minnesota)

References

External links

 City of Sleepy Eye
 Sleepy Eye Chamber of Commerce
 Sleepy Eye Herald Dispatch
History of Chief Sleepy Eye
Schools
Sleepy Eye Public Schools
St. Mary's Catholic School
St. John's Lutheran Church and School of Sleepy Eye

Cities in Brown County, Minnesota
Cities in Minnesota